Jānis Andriksons (17 March 1912 – 22 September 1967) was a Latvian speed skater. He competed in three events at the 1936 Winter Olympics.

After World War II, he moved to West Germany and then to Canada, where from 1948 he worked in gold and copper mining. He died in Quebec in 1967.

References

External links
 

1912 births
1967 deaths
People from Cēsis Municipality
People from Kreis Wenden
Latvian male speed skaters
Olympic speed skaters of Latvia
Speed skaters at the 1936 Winter Olympics
Latvian World War II refugees
Latvian emigrants to Canada